Mark Arthur Strittmatter (born April 4, 1969) is an American former professional baseball player and current coach for the Colorado Rockies.

College
Strittmatter played baseball at the County College of Morris in Randolph, New Jersey, for two years before transferring to Virginia Commonwealth University where he helped lead VCU to the Metro Conference Championship in 1992.

Playing career
Strittmatter spent most all of his playing career in the minor leagues (1992–2000) after being drafted by the Colorado Rockies in June 1992.

Strittmatter's only Major League playing experience came in September 1998, appearing in four games. He went hitless in 4 total at bats, striking out his first three times up and in a pinch-hitting appearance in his fourth chance flying out to centerfield. Strittmatter handled 11 chances flawlessly in the field. He made his major league debut on September 3, 1998 as the starting catcher wearing #22 at County Stadium vs. the Milwaukee Brewers.

Personal life
Strittmatter and his wife, Katie, have two children, son Sean and daughter Emily. He helps out with youth baseball players as a part of his foundation for youth.

References

External links

1969 births
Living people
Major League Baseball catchers
Major League Baseball bullpen catchers
Colorado Rockies players
VCU Rams baseball players
Baseball players from New York (state)
People from Huntington, New York
Bend Rockies players
Central Valley Rockies players
Colorado Springs Sky Sox players
New Haven Ravens players
Las Vegas Stars (baseball) players
Morris Titans baseball players